Union Canal may refer to:

 Union Canal (Scotland), a canal in Scotland between Edinburgh and Falkirk
 Union Canal (Pennsylvania), a 19th-century canal in Pennsylvania, United States, closed in 1880

See also
 Grand Union Canal, England